The Siemens-Halske Sh 13 was a five-cylinder air-cooled radial engine for aircraft produced in Germany in the 1920s and 1930s. First run in 1928, it was rated at 60 kW (80 hp).

Applications
 Albatros L 82
 Focke-Wulf S 24
 Junkers A 50

Specifications (Sh 13a)

See also

References

External links

 Description of Siemens-Halske radial engines (German language) - bungartz.nl

Siemens-Halske aircraft engines
1920s aircraft piston engines
Aircraft air-cooled radial piston engines